Palaminy is a commune in the Haute-Garonne department in southwestern France.

Geography

Climate

Palaminy has a oceanic climate (Köppen climate classification Cfb).

Population

The inhabitants of the commune are called Palaminyciens

See also
Communes of the Haute-Garonne department

References

Communes of Haute-Garonne